Restore Oregon, formerly the Historic Preservation League of Oregon (HPLO), is a 501(c)(3) nonprofit corporation with a mission to "Preserve, Reuse, and Pass Forward Oregon’s Historic Resources to Ensure Livable, Sustainable Communities." Formed in Eugene, Oregon, in 1976, Restore Oregon was officially incorporated in 1977 and relocated to Portland, Oregon, soon thereafter. In addition to the Board of Directors, Restore Oregon has several active volunteer committees and a regional and topical Board of Advisors. As of February 2009, Peggy Moretti serves as the organization’s Executive Director. Known for 37 years as the Historic Preservation League of Oregon, the group announced in July 2013 that it was changing its name to Restore Oregon.

Goals and means

According to the organization’s website, the goals and means of Restore Oregon are as follows:
 Preserve and pass forward endangered historic sites, properties and districts.
 Ensure sufficient economic incentives for historic preservation.
 Ensure appropriate land use policies, development guidelines and preservation standards to address the full spectrum of preservation opportunities.
 Educate and increase awareness of the value of preservation and its essential role in sustainability.
 Advocate at the state and local government level, participate in policy-making.
 Provide effective tools for preservation in the form of conservation easements and actionable information.
 Maintain a consistent presence in the community.
 Include and constructively engage various perspectives from preservation, cultural, development, government, and other sectors.
 Provide services statewide by creating a league of partner organizations across Oregon.

Advocacy and education
Since October 1976, Restore Oregon has published a quarterly newsletter, Field Notes, made available to members and friends of the organization. Although Field Notes is still direct mailed to members desiring hard copies, an online version is available to all supporters through an email subscription.

In 2010 Restore Oregon’s Advocacy Committee released a Special Report on Healthy Historic Districts to conclude its annual Preservation Roundtable. Grounded in research and stakeholder feedback, Healthy Historic Districts examined the challenges and opportunities that face Oregon’s commercial districts listed in the National Register of Historic Places. In partnership with individuals, organizations, and governmental agencies, Restore Oregon promotes the advancement of the recommendations made in Healthy Historic Districts and, as of February 2011, is in the planning stages of a 2011 Preservation Roundtable.

As part of Restore Oregon’s advocacy program, in 2011 the organization unveiled the inaugural list of Oregon's Most Endangered Places. Nominations to the Most Endangered Places list were accepted through March 21, 2011, and an announcement of the selected sites happened May 23, 2011, in Portland. The program is based on the successful America's Most Endangered Places list administered by the National Trust for Historic Preservation. In 2011, 10 properties were included on the list. The 2012 list included nine properties.

Conservation easements
Restore Oregon is a holder of conservation easements as a means of ensuring the long-term preservation of historic places across Oregon. Since 1981, Restore Oregon has accepted donations of over 40 easements on a variety of buildings, large and small, urban and rural.

References

External links
Historic Preservation League of Oregon

Historic preservation organizations in the United States
Organizations based in Portland, Oregon
Oregon culture
Non-profit organizations based in Oregon
1976 establishments in Oregon